Kim Dong-wook (born 1983) is a South Korean actor.

Kim Dong-wook may also refer to:

 JK Kim Dong-wook (born 1975), South Korean singer
 Kim Dong-wook (footballer) (born 1989), South Korean footballer
 Kim Dong-wook (speed skater) (born 1993), South Korean short track speed skater